Konkovo is a rural locality (a village) in Parfyonovskoye Rural Settlement, Velikoustyugsky District, Vologda Oblast, Russia. The population was 21 as of 2002.

Geography 
The distance to Veliky Ustyug is 29.5 km, to Karasovo is 18 km. Slobodka is the nearest rural locality.

References 

Rural localities in Velikoustyugsky District